Benjamin Jeannot (born 22 January 1992) is a French professional footballer who plays as a striker for Ligue 2 club Caen.

A French youth international, Jeannot starred for his nation at under-16, under-17, and under-18 level. With the under-17 team, Jeannot played at the 2009 UEFA European Under-17 Football Championship in Germany.

Career

Early career 
Jeannot began his career with local club AS Dommartin-les-Toul in September 1999. In June 2002, he joined professional club AS Nancy. While in the club's youth academy, Jeannot scored 594 goals in various youth team sections.

Professional career 
In July 2009, Jeannot signed his first professional contract agreeing to a three-year deal with Nancy until June 2012. The contract made Jeannot the youngest professional football player in the club's history. He was, subsequently, promoted to the club reserve team in the Championnat de France amateur, the fourth level of French football. Jeannot appeared in 16 matches with the team scoring only one goal. In the 2010–11 season, he started the season with the reserve team again. After promising performances with the team, which included scoring all four goals in a victory over Lyon Duchère, Jeannot was called up to the senior team by manager Pablo Correa in February 2011. He made his professional debut on 12 February in the club's 3–1 win over Auxerre appearing as a substitute. Two weeks later, Jeannot appeared as a substitute in the team's 2–1 defeat to Marseille. On 11 March 2011, Jeannot signed a three-year contract extension with Nancy until June 2015. After signing the extension, he was permanently promoted to the first-team by manager Pablo Correa and assigned the number 10 shirt.

In 2012 July, he was loaned to Châteauroux, in Ligue 2.

International career 
Jeannot is a French youth international having starred for his nation at under-16, under-17, and under-18 level. He made his youth international debut at under-16 level on 4 December 2007 appearing as a substitute in a 3–0 victory over the Republic of Ireland. Jeannot appeared in six of the team's remaining seven matches as he failed to score a goal. At under-17 level, he made his debut with the team on 24 August 2008 in a 2–1 win over Slovakia in a tournament held in Austria. Jeannot scored his first youth international goal on 6 November in a 2–0 win over the United States. As a result of his performances with the team, he was named to the squad to participate in the 2009 UEFA European Under-17 Football Championship. Jeannot started all three group stage matches as France crashed out of the competition in the group stage portion. At under-18 level, he appeared in six matches. Jeannot made his debut with the team at the Sendai Cup in Japan appearing in all three group stage matches. After missing two call-ups, he returned to the team to participate in the 2010 edition of the Copa del Atlántico, a yearly youth international competition held on the Canary Islands in Spain. In the opening group stage match against the hosts, Jeannot scored the equalizing goal in the team's 2–2 draw.

Career statistics

Club

Notes

References

External links 
 
 
 

Living people
1992 births
People from Laxou
French footballers
Association football forwards
Ligue 1 players
Ligue 2 players
LB Châteauroux players
AS Nancy Lorraine players
FC Lorient players
Dijon FCO players
Stade Malherbe Caen players
France under-21 international footballers
France youth international footballers
Sportspeople from Meurthe-et-Moselle
Footballers from Grand Est